Hazar may refer to:

Hazar (name)
the Turkish for Khazar
 Lake Hazar, Turkey
Hazar mountains, Iran
Hazar, Iran, a village in Kerman Province
Hazar, Turkmenistan, a city in Balkan Province, Turkmenistan

See also 
 Hezar (disambiguation)
 Hazara (disambiguation)
 Hazare, a surname